Pinehouse Lake Airport  is located adjacent to Pinehouse Lake and serves Pinehouse, Saskatchewan, Canada.

See also 
 List of airports in Saskatchewan

References

External links 

Registered aerodromes in Saskatchewan